Michael Bradley (born 20 July 1955) is a Canadian politician, who has served as the mayor of Sarnia, Ontario since 1988, and the 66th person to hold the office. He is the longest-serving mayor in Sarnia City Council history and currently the second longest-serving mayor in the province of Ontario behind Milton's Gord Krantz.

Politics
Prior to his entering elected office, he served as executive assistant to Sarnia—Lambton MP Bud Cullen. With this experience, Bradley made the decision to first run for public office in 1984, trying to take Cullen's soon to be vacated seat. He was nominated by Cullen's Liberal party as candidate for Sarnia—Lambton but finished second to Progressive Conservative Ken James.

Bradley then turned his eyes to municipal politics.  He was elected alderman in 1985 and decided to run for mayor three years later upon the death of Mayor Marceil Saddy. The 1988 municipal election featured four council members running for the mayor's position; the other three were Doug Bain, veteran alderman Wills Rawana, and alderman Elizabeth Wood. Bradley won re-election in 1991, 1994, 1997, 2000, 2003, 2006 and 2010, in particular defeating the 1988 interim Mayor Ron Gordon a second time in the 1994 election. On 27 October 2014, Bradley was elected as mayor for his ninth consecutive term.

In 2010, the Ontario Disability Employment Network approached Bradley about issuing a challenge to other mayors to employee individuals with disabilities.

Active politician
Bradley is quite visible in his role as mayor, in both his formal roles and in other casual circumstances.  He has appeared on many parliamentary committees on behalf of the municipal sector, and has made numerous media appearances, including a regular stint as a discussion panelist on Ontario Morning, CBC Radio One's local morning show in Southern Ontario. A lengthy interview with him in his office at Sarnia City Hall also appeared in Michael Moore's documentary Bowling for Columbine.

As commentator
Bradley is a frequent media commentator on local, provincial, national and international issues. He has appeared on Prime Time News Town Hall Series with Jean Chrétien; NBC News with Tom Brokaw; CNN; CBC Radio Noon; Focus Ontario; As It Happens; and the current CBC Radio shows. He appears on CBC's Ontario Morning Mayors' Panel and was a regular on the national CBC radio show The Point. Bradley appeared in Michael Moore's Bowling for Columbine and was called by Moore "The Voice of Reason". He writes a column for Sarnia Lambton This Week—a mixture of humour, politics and about life—called "Open Mike", which was described by the London Free Press as "having more laughs than a Dave Barry column." Bradley, a long-time Bruce Springsteen fan, contributed to two books about Springsteen in 2007 and 2009—For You and The Light in the Darkness—by Lawrence Kirsch. Mike Bradley also appeared on The Agenda with Steve Paikin in his series "Growing Sarnia."

Bradley was also interviewed by Kevin McShan, a graduate of the St. Clair College Journalism program who now has his own YouTube channel. McShan did an interview on 14 May 2015 on the YouTube channel "What does Windsor Need to do to hire more individuals with Disabilities?" Bradley mentioned, "Well simply, they can look at student hiring, we have had over 60 students in a population of 75,000 in the last four years who were challenged. It continues to grow and now the County and other agencies along with the private sector. So the city has to show leadership and I will be sending out at the end of the month to all Mayors and Council the new Mayor's challenge which will give them an opportunity to show how good it is and how simple it is to do so."

He also mentioned, "In order to continue this positive momentum forward, it's all about maintaining environments where everyone has the opportunity to watch their fingerprints in the sand of independence and equality." This interview was done on 30 May 2015 in the YouTube video, "Sarnia Leads by Example: Hiring individuals with disabilities." This was also done by Kevin McShan as well.

Bradley was also interviewed on The Alim Show (done by Alim Nathoo who was born and raised in Sarnia, Ontario) on 100.3 Sound FM CKMS Radio Waterloo CKMS-FM on 23 February 2016 where he talked about his advocacy for hiring People with Disabilities and how people need to do the right thing by allowing them to participate fully in society. He also mentioned the importance of all cities to have all public transit buses to have "Stop Announcements" and how it is the law to have that in the Province of Ontario. He also mentioned that he has hired People with Disabilities at Sarnia City Hall and ensured all citizens have equal access for jobs and services in the City of Sarnia and the Province of Ontario.

Controversy
In the summer of 2016 Sarnia City Council approved of a 90-day suspension of Bradley's pay following an integrity commissioner's recommendation. The report concluded that Bradley verbally abused, harassed and bullied city employees creating a "toxic environment at city hall" which lead to abrupt resignations of Sarnia's city clerk and planning director.

Council decided on 24 October 2016 to relocate Mayor Mike Bradley's office to the Sarnia Transit building until a new office can be built for him at City Hall away from staff. During the emotionally charged meeting, some members of the public in attendance heckled Council for continuing to penalize Bradley.

The restrictions were lifted by council on March 4, 2019.

Electoral record

Sarnia municipal election results (Mayor), 2018 Unofficial

Sarnia municipal election results (Mayor), 2014

Sarnia municipal election results (Mayor), 2010

Sarnia municipal election results (Mayor), 2006
{| class="wikitable"
|-
! bgcolor="#DDDDFF" width="200px" | Candidate
! bgcolor="#DDDDFF" width="50px" | Vote
! bgcolor="#DDDDFF" width="30px" | %
|-
|Michael Bradley (X) || 12,623 || 57.06
|-
|Joe Murray  || 6,421 || 29.02
|-
|Dick Carpani  || 2,747 || 12.42
|-
|Carlos Murray  || 332 || 1.50
|-
|Total Valid Votes|| 22,336 || 42.00
|-
|colspan="3" align="center" | Reference:

Source: Sarnia Lambton Votes

Sarnia municipal election results (Mayor), 2003

Federal

Source: Elections Canada

References

External links
Mike Bradley

Mayors of Sarnia
Politicians from Adelaide
20th-century Canadian politicians
Australian emigrants to Canada
1955 births
Living people